Li Lan (born July 12, 1961) is a former Chinese handball player. She competed in the 1984 Summer Olympics.

She was a member of the Chinese handball team which won the bronze medal. She played all five matches and scored nine goals.

External links
profile

1961 births
Living people
Chinese female handball players
Handball players at the 1984 Summer Olympics
Olympic bronze medalists for China
Olympic handball players of China
Olympic medalists in handball
Medalists at the 1984 Summer Olympics
20th-century Chinese women